"Young Parisians" is the debut single from Adam and the Ants, released by Decca Records on 20 October 1978. The A-side "Young Parisians" was an acoustic cabaret-style number, while the B-side, "Lady"  demonstrated the band's capacity for fast-paced punk rock.

At the time, the band were combining the punk sound of their earliest days with a more experimental ethos which would characterize their 1979 debut Dirk Wears White Sox and, to some extent, its 1980 follow-up Kings of the Wild Frontier (by which time only Adam Ant remained from the line-up of the debut single).

In December 1980, following the initial success of Kings of the Wild Frontier and its singles "Dog Eat Dog" and 'Antmusic', the single was re-promoted in the UK, reaching #9 on the UK Singles Chart. In Australia, DJs on Sydney's Double J radio station preferred to play the B-side, "Lady", which garnered enough attention for "Lady" rather than the A-Side to appear on the 1980 compilation album In the Bag. "Young Parisians" has been included on Antmusic: The Very Best of Adam Ant & The Very Best Of Adam And The Ants. A demo version is the lead track on the first disc of the Antbox three CD set.

Credits
It was produced by the band's singer Adam Ant and session pianist Jo Julian. At this point, the other permanent members of the band were Matthew Ashman (guitar), Dave Barbarossa (drums) and Andy Warren (bass guitar). Saxophonist Greg Mason also appeared on the A-side.

Track list

A-side
"Young Parisians" - 3:02

B-side
"Lady" - 2:03

Damaged Goods
Damaged Goods Records released a 12" single of "Young Parisians" & "Lady" in 1989. Both tracks appear on the A-side, while two "Dodgy Interviews" appear on the B-side. The first interview was conducted with Zerox Fanzine in Chelmsford 4 February 1979. The second was done for Pogo Fanzine in Italy after the band's performance in Milan 17 October 1978. The A-side plays at 45 RPM, and the B-side plays at 33 RPM.

References

External links
 Boy George & Adam Ant
Young Parisians at Discogs

1978 debut singles
Adam and the Ants songs
Songs written by Adam Ant
Songs about Paris
1978 songs
Decca Records singles